Vladimir Aleksandrovich Grishchenko (born 20 March 1972) is a former Russian football player.

References

1972 births
Living people
Soviet footballers
Russian footballers
Russian expatriate footballers
Expatriate footballers in Uzbekistan
FC Chernomorets Novorossiysk players
Russian Premier League players
FC Spartak Sumy players
Expatriate footballers in Ukraine
FC Mordovia Saransk players
FC Uholyok Myrnohrad players
FC Slavyansk Slavyansk-na-Kubani players
Association football midfielders
Association football forwards